The Interlaken ship canal is a  long canal in the Swiss canton of Bern. It connects Lake Thun with a quay in the town of Interlaken adjacent to Interlaken West railway station, thus allowing shipping services on the lake to serve the town and connect with railway services. It is still in regular use by the Lake Thun passenger ships of the BLS AG.

The canal parallels the Aar river throughout its length. It has no locks and maintains the same water level as Lake Thun throughout. As a consequence, the water level of the canal at Interlaken West is significantly lower than that of the adjacent river and surrounding land. 

At the other side of Interlaken, the uppermost reach of the Interlaken section of the Aar river is used by the Lake Brienz passenger ships of the BLS AG to reach Interlaken Ost railway station.

History 
Shipping services on Lake Thun date back to at least 1834, when the first steamship was introduced to connect the towns of Thun and Interlaken, at each end of the lake.

In 1872, the Bödelibahn railway was constructed from Därligen, on Lake Thun, to Interlaken, and the Interlaken terminus of the Lake Brienz shipping services was moved to Därligen. However by the 1890s the railway was being extended to connect with Thun and the rest of the Swiss railway network, threatening the shipping services, and the United Steam Navigation Company for Lakes Thun and Brienz (VDG) who operated those services responded by constructing the Interlaken ship canal to allow their vessels to reach the centre of Interlaken. The canal was built between 1890 and 1892.

The VDG merged with the Thunersee railway in 1912. In turn, this new company was taken over by the Bern-Lötschberg-Simplon railway, which eventually became part of BLS AG, the current operators of the lake shipping.

References

External links 
 
 Shipping pages  from BLS AG web site

Canals in Switzerland
Lake Thun
Ship canals
Transport in Interlaken
Canals opened in 1892